Waldo Hall is a building on the Oregon State University (OSU) campus in Corvallis, Oregon, United States. The building's fourth floor, inaccessible to the public, is one of several reportedly haunted sites on campus.

Waldo Hall was named in 1907 for Clara H. Waldo, the wife of pioneer and Oregon supreme court judge John B. Waldo. She served on OSU's board of regents and was the first woman in the U.S. to serve on the board of a state college. She was also the first woman to address an OSU graduation class.

See also
 Reportedly haunted locations in Oregon

References

External links
 
 Haunted Waldo?, Special Collections & Archives Research Center, Oregon State University Libraries

Oregon State University buildings
Reportedly haunted locations in Oregon